SC Woezik is a football club from Wijchen, Netherlands. SC Woezik plays in the 2020–21 Sunday Eerste Klasse C. Between 2017–19, the club competed in the Hoofdklasse.

References

External links
 Official site

Football clubs in the Netherlands
Football clubs in Wijchen
Association football clubs established in 1961
1961 establishments in the Netherlands